Bataguassu is a municipality located in the Brazilian state of Mato Grosso do Sul. Its population was 23,325 (2020) and its area is 2,417 km². The town was founded by Jan Antonín Baťa, the king of shoes, in 1932.

Compared to Anaurilândia and Bataiporã, Bataguassu is a larger settlement. Besides housing, there are various buildings built to support the town's people.

Other towns in Brazil linked to Bata:
 Mariápolis
 Anaurilândia
 Batatuba
 Bataiporã

References

Municipalities in Mato Grosso do Sul
Bata Corporation